Ark Putney Academy (formerly Elliott School) is a co-educational secondary school and sixth form with academy status, located in the Putney Heath area of the London Borough of Wandsworth, England.

History
It was first established as Southfields School in 1904 on Merton Road, Southfields. The school was renamed Elliott School in 1911, and in 1956 it amalgamated with Huntingfield Secondary Modern School on a new site in Pullman Gardens, to become Elliott Comprehensive School. Former pupils include a number of famous people such as Pierce Brosnan, and the school has appeared in the films Love Actually and The Kid Who Would Be King. In 2012 the school converted to academy status and was renamed ARK Putney Academy.

The main part of school is a Grade II listed building designed in the early 1950s by G A Trevett of the London County Council architects' department. It was among the early work of John Bancroft who worked as an assistant on the project. English Heritage have described it as "perhaps the finest of the large comprehensive schools built by the London County Council architects".

In 2012 Wandsworth Council decided that much of the new ARK Putney Academy's open space would be sold for housing to pay for a major refurbishment of the main school buildings. The decision, which included the demolition of some existing outer buildings, received formal planning permission in October 2013, with the refurbishment taking place the following year.

References

External links
Ark Putney Academy official website
Elliott School official website
 

Secondary schools in the London Borough of Wandsworth
Educational institutions established in 1904
1904 establishments in England
Academies in the London Borough of Wandsworth
Putney
Putney